Wipeout 2097 (released as Wipeout XL in North America and Japan) is a futuristic racing game developed and published by Psygnosis. It is the second installment released in the Wipeout series and the direct sequel of the original game released the previous year. It was originally released in 1996 for the PlayStation, and in 1997 for Microsoft Windows and the Sega Saturn. It was later ported by Digital Images to the Amiga in 1999 and by Coderus to Mac OS in 2002.

Whereas the original game introduced the F3600 anti-gravity racing league in 2052, Wipeout 2097 is set over four decades later and introduces the player to the much faster, more competitive, and more dangerous F5000 AG racing league. The game introduced a new damage interface and new weapons and tracks. The Sega Saturn version supported analogue control by using its 3D Control Pad, whereas the PlayStation version supported analogue control only through using the optional NeGcon twist controller.

Wipeout 2097 received critical acclaim upon release; reviewers praised the game for its dramatic improvements to the controls, graphics, and gameplay of the original Wipeout. It has appeared on lists of the greatest games of all time by multiple publications.

Gameplay 

Gameplay does not differ much from the previous title. Aside from the different circuits and new weapons, the fundamental aspects were kept. Pilots race each other or computer-controlled A.I. opponents to finish in the highest position possible.

Though the crafts move at very high straight-line speeds, Wipeout takes its inspiration from Formula 1 breakthroughs by aspiring for even greater turning speeds. Using the Formula 1 parallel, rather than using aerodynamics to increase wheel grip by down-force for faster turning speeds, Wipeout uses a fictionalised method of air braking for ever greater turning force. Just moving a craft left or right alone is very responsive, but by applying an air-brake in the direction of movement, players zip around very tight turns at near top speed, including those greater than 90 degrees. By applying an air-brake, the turn starts out gradually but as it continues, change in direction increases sharply. Where necessary, the player may also use dual air-brakes for rapid deceleration, typically used if the pilot has flown off the racing line in tight corners and needs to steady. The player can also take damage from enemy fire and be blown up, but the ship can be "recharged" to health at the pit stop in exchange for a precious few seconds of the race.

Aside from the usual tactical aspects of racing, Wipeout 2097 (unlike its predecessor) offered the chance to eliminate other drivers from the competition by destroying their craft with weapons. Each craft has a shield energy quota, and when this quota reaches zero—either from damage sustained from weapon attacks, or impact from other craft or the edges of the circuit—the craft blows up. The craft also blows up if the time limit is reached, though this only applies to human players. The biggest weapon introduced in 2097 was the Quake Disruptor, which has been a series hallmark ever since. This weapon causes a quake to whip up the track, sending opponent craft into the air and smashing back down.

The aim of the game remains the same from its predecessor: complete increasingly difficult challenges to move on to the next race. The difficulty level is changed by increasing the top speed of the craft, through four different classes (Vector, Venom, Rapier, and Phantom). The number of laps needed to complete a race also increased with each new class. Victory in the challenge modes is the game's ultimate accomplishment. These modes are similar to a championship where players have to race every track to become a champion; however, rather than tallying up points, Challenge mode takes a very single player-centric approach by only allowing progress to the next track by coming in first on the current track. Players can lose the mode by losing all three lives, which are lost by finishing a race in worse than third position. By winning all the races, the player is crowned champion and given access to faster modes, new tracks and ultimately the Piranha craft.

Development 
As with the first installment, Wipeout 2097 was developed by Liverpudlian developer Psygnosis and the promotional art was designed by Sheffield-based The Designers Republic. The development cycle ran for seven months. To cater for the increase in Wipeout players, an easier learning curve was introduced whilst keeping the difficulty at the top end for the experienced gamers. The game was originally intended as a tracks add-on for the original Wipeout. No sequel had been planned, but Andy Satterthwaite (who worked on the MS-DOS version of the original) was asked by Psygnosis to apply for the role "internal producer". He did, and during the interview, asked to do a sequel to Wipeout, but instead ended up developing extra tracks. The add-on was titled Wipeout 2097 because Psygnosis did not want to give the impression that it was a full sequel. In the United States, it went by the name of Wipeout XL because it was felt that American players would not understand the concept of the game being set a century in the future. The American title was originally to be Wipeout XS (for "Excess"), but it was pointed out that XS could also stand for "extra small". Satterthwaite ended up with a team of two coders (two of whom were new), six artists, and Nick Burcombe.

The game's look was influenced by Japanese culture because the team had worked with The Designers Republic. Nicky Westcott was the lead artist, and her team built on the original vehicle designs. She also worked with the designers and coders on the tracks. Custom tools were created in Softimage to develop the tracks, which were tweaked and the team played each other's tracks to obtain feedback. During the process, Satterthwaite realised that he could do more than the tracks add-on he was tasked with producing. Work on the tracks began in January 1996, and the plan was to select eight tracks out of twenty designed and built in a month. Their "skinning" was expected to be complete by June, with the game anticipated for release in October. Despite the work involved, Satterthwaite had three uninvolved coders. The collision code from the original Wipeout was also completely overhauled.

Burcombe wanted to improve on the original's ship handling and introduce a new weapon, which led to new power-up ideas. Westcott said that it was a collaboration between the areas because of the strict deadline. The gameplay change that had the most interest was what happened to ships that hit track edges. That ships stopped immediately in the original game was considered too harsh. It was desired that ships scraped the edges instead, and this took longer than expected to develop. Ghost vehicles were only featured in the European version because Atari had a patent on them from Hard Drivin' in the United States. The team wanted to make it possible to win races in any ship, and a challenge was to make them all feel different and to still have their worth. Months of work rebalancing the artificial intelligence was undertaken to ensure all vehicle and track settings were a challenge. Sony wanted a link-up feature, which proved difficult due to syncing issues and the frame rate differences between PAL and NTSC. Much extra content, such as more difficult tracks and a prototype ship, was added because, according to Westcott, the team were both enthusiastic and stressed, and described their development as "a period of great energy and immense exhaustion at the same time".

An entire United Kingdom nightclub tour was initiated in conjunction with the Red Bull energy drink, which was featured prominently throughout the game before the drink actually gained popularity in the American market.

The game was first unveiled in the form of a pre-alpha demo at the May 1996 Electronic Entertainment Expo. Wipeout 2097 was released in 1996 and sold around a million copies. Ports for the Sega Saturn, Amiga, Apple Macintosh, and PC were later released.

Music 
New music was mostly recorded from Psygnosis's in-house music team, CoLD SToRAGE, for versions released outside the PlayStation. The songs of the PlayStation, Sega Saturn and the Windows and Mac versions could also be listened to by inserting the CD into a CD player (and skipping the first track). The soundtrack was also released as an audio CD, though with a different artist and track listing.

Reception

PlayStation
In the United Kingdom, it was among the nineteen best-selling PlayStation games of 1996, according to HMV.

Air Hendrix scored the PlayStation version a perfect 5 out of 5 in every category (FunFactor, control, sound, and graphics) in GamePro, citing "across-the-board innovations" over the already excellent original WipeOut. He particularly remarked that the controls are much more refined, fairer, and easier to master, and that the frame rate and graphical effects are much more impressive. Tom Ham of GameSpot also commented on the control improvements and approved of the new ability to destroy opponents. Additionally praising the elaborate backgrounds, detailed sound effects, and more aggressive A.I., he deemed it "a must buy." IGN said that it had topped the original in terms of music, number of simultaneous racers, A.I., weapons, and graphics, and concluded, "It's games like this that make you proud to be a PlayStation owner." In 1996, Next Generation ranked Wipeout 2097 as the 32nd top game of all time for how "playing linked Wipeout comes close to gaming at its very best", noting that the game could have been a technology demonstration for PlayStation. Edge gave both the PlayStation and Sega Saturn versions a score of 8 out of 10, with similar remarks of its improved graphics and its gameplay.

Electronic Gaming Monthly editors awarded Wipeout 2097 Best Music of 1996 and a runner-up (behind Super Mario 64) for Best Graphics. In 1997, The Official PlayStation Magazine named it the fifth top PlayStation game yet, and Electronic Gaming Monthly named the PlayStation version the 96th best game of all time, calling it "the first game of the cyberpunk-esque 'electronic age,' before the electronic age was just a hype-filled buzzword." In IGNs top 25 PlayStation games of all-time list it ranked 13th, noted for being often considered the PlayStation's best racing game of its time and was chosen ahead of others in the series because Wipeout 2097 was "the one they preferred to keep coming back to". In 2003, Wipeout 2097 was inducted into GameSpot's list of the greatest games of all time. It ranks as the third-best PlayStation game at GameRankings with an average review score of 94.75 per cent from ten different sources.

Ports
Rich Leadbetter of Sega Saturn Magazine commented that the Saturn version, while not as good as the PlayStation original, is a much closer conversion than the Saturn port of the first Wipeout, particularly in terms of the fluidity, control, and sense of speed. He deemed it the second best racing game on the Saturn, exceeded only by Sega Rally Championship.

Jeff Gerstmann reviewed the PC version in GameSpot, assessing that "The PC version's Direct3D support gives this new release a nice face-lift, while still keeping intact the fast action and stylized graphics that console players have come to know and love." He said that the new soundtrack, while good, is a disappointment compared to the PlayStation version's techno tracks, but gave the game a strong recommendation. Next Generation stated that "If you have a 3D accelerator of any sort, you owe it to yourself to pick up this game. Its nearly flawless gameplay, pumping soundtrack, and visual excellence mark it as a showcase title and all around good time."

References

External links

1996 video games
2097
Amiga games
Classic Mac OS games
Golden Joystick Award winners
Multiplayer and single-player video games
PlayStation (console) games
Sega Saturn games
Video games developed in the United Kingdom
Video games set in the 2090s
Video games scored by Tim Wright (Welsh musician)
Video games set in Canada
Video games set in Chile
Video games set in France
Video games set in Germany
Video games set in Nepal
Video games set in Ukraine
Video games set in the United States
Video game sequels
Windows games
Wipeout (series)